Johannes Schöttler (also spelled Schoettler, born 27 August 1984) is a German badminton player. He competed for Germany in the men's doubles at the 2012 Summer Olympics with Ingo Kindervater and 2016 Summer Olympics with Michael Fuchs.

Achievements

BWF Superseries 
The BWF Superseries, which was launched on 14 December 2006 and implemented in 2007, was a series of elite badminton tournaments, sanctioned by the Badminton World Federation (BWF). BWF Superseries levels were Superseries and Superseries Premier. A season of Superseries consisted of twelve tournaments around the world that had been introduced since 2011. Successful players were invited to the Superseries Finals, which were held at the end of each year.

Men's doubles

  BWF Superseries Finals tournament
  BWF Superseries Premier tournament
  BWF Superseries tournament

BWF Grand Prix 
The BWF Grand Prix had two levels, the Grand Prix and Grand Prix Gold. It was a series of badminton tournaments sanctioned by the Badminton World Federation (BWF) and played between 2007 and 2017.

Men's doubles

  BWF Grand Prix Gold tournament
  BWF Grand Prix tournament

BWF International Challenge/Series 
Men's doubles

Mixed doubles

  BWF International Challenge tournament
  BWF International Series tournament

Record against selected opponents 
Men's doubles results with Ingo Kindervater against Super Series finalists, World Championships semifinalists, and Olympic quarterfinalists, as well as all Olympic opponents.

  Ross Smith & Glenn Warfe 1–0
  Cai Yun & Fu Haifeng 0–2
  Chai Biao & Guo Zhendong 0–2
  Liu Xiaolong & Qiu Zihan 0–2
  Fang Chieh-min & Lee Sheng-mu 0–1
  Mathias Boe & Carsten Mogensen 0–5
  Lars Påske & Jonas Rasmussen 0–1
  Jonas Rasmussen & Mads Conrad-Petersen 1–0
  Markis Kido & Hendra Setiawan 1–0
  Muhammad Ahsan & Hendra Setiawan 0–1
  Hirokatsu Hashimoto & Noriyasu Hirata 0–4
  Hiroyuki Endo & Kenichi Hayakawa 0–3
  Jung Jae-sung & Lee Yong-dae 0–3
  Ko Sung-hyun & Lee Yong-dae 1–2
  Ko Sung-hyun & Yoo Yeon-seong 1–1
  Mohd Zakry Abdul Latif & Mohd Fairuzizuan Mohd Tazari 0–2
  Koo Kien Keat & Tan Boon Heong 0–1
  Bodin Isara & Maneepong Jongjit 0–1

References

External links 

 
 
 
 
 
 

1984 births
Living people
Sportspeople from Hamburg
German male badminton players
Olympic badminton players of Germany
Badminton players at the 2012 Summer Olympics
Badminton players at the 2016 Summer Olympics